Ahsaas Channa (born 5 August 1999) is an Indian actress who works in the Hindi film and TV industry. As a child actor, she worked in Vaastu Shastra, Kabhi Alvida Naa Kehna, My Friend Ganesha, Phoonk, among others, and as a teenager, she has been mostly active in television shows, such as Devon Ke Dev...Mahadev, Oye Jassie and MTV Fanaah.

Early life
Channa was born into a Punjabi Sikh family in Mumbai, Maharashtra on 5 August 1999. Her father Iqbal Singh Channa is a Punjabi film producer while her mother Kulbir Kaur Badesron is a television actress.

Career
Channa started her career at a very young age. She made her debut with the movie Vaastu Shastra where she played the role of Rohan, Sushmita Sen's son. She also played the role of Ashu in My Friend Ganesha and Arjun in Kabhi Alvida Naa Kehna.

On television, she acted in Nikhil Sinha's Devon Ke Dev...Mahadev as Ashokasundari, lord Shiva and Parvati's daughter. She also played the role of Dhara in MTV Fanaah, the mini TV series that aired on MTV India starting on 21 July 2014.  She was seen in Disney Channel's show Oye Jassie and in the fourth season of Best of Luck Nikki.

She has been part of various web shows, sketches etc. on popular digital platforms in India.

Filmography

Films

Television

Web series

Short films

References

External links
 
 
 

1999 births
Living people
Actresses from Mumbai
Indian film actresses
Indian television actresses
Indian soap opera actresses
Indian web series actresses
Actresses in Hindi cinema
Actresses in Hindi television
Indian child actresses
Child actresses in Hindi cinema
Indian television child actresses
Punjabi people
Indian Sikhs
Punjabi women
21st-century Indian child actresses
21st-century Indian actresses